Yale is a city in Payne County, Oklahoma, United States. The population was 1,059 at the 2020 census, a decline of 13.6 percent from the figure of 1,227 in 2010.

History

When the Eastern Oklahoma Railway built its line across Payne County, a group led by George W. Canfield began a different townsite also within Eagle Township that would be closer to the railroad, at its planned junction with the Missouri–Kansas–Texas Railroad. Underwood moved his store to the new site in 1902, making the new site the permanent location for the town of Yale. A 1907 map shows the town contained 230 acres surrounding the railroad junction, and to its east southeast the Underwood farm of 158 acres. By 1910, Yale had a population of 685, supported mostly by agricultural services and cotton processing.

On September 23, 1913, an oil well on the Randle farm produced a gusher. An even larger gusher began producing a month later. More discoveries followed. By the end of 1914, the combined Yale and Cushing fields were producing 220,000 barrels a day. The town boomed, attaining a population of 2,601 by the census of 1920.

The oil boom quickly deflated. Production began to decline sharply in 1915, and more dry holes were reported. Major producers began to shut down or reduce operations in the early 1920s. By 1930, the population had dropped to 1,734. In 1940, the census reported a population of 1,407. The decline continued until reaching a low of 1,239 in 1970. There was a spike by 1980, when the census recorded 1,652, but the downward trend resumed through 2010. Town officials have tried to stem the decline by promoting Yale as a retirement location.

Geography
Yale is located at  (36.114708, -96.698469).

The primary source of Yale's water supply is Lone Chimney Lake. The lake's level has been declining for several years because of prolonged drought conditions and high water consumption of water by Yale and other Oklahoma towns that rely on this lake as their primary source.

Demographics

As of the census of 2010, there were 1,227 people living in the city.  The population density was 1,473.3 people per square mile (569.4/km). There were 604 housing units at an average density of 670 per square mile (259/km).  The racial makeup of the city was 87.63% White, 6.93% Native American, 0.30% Asian, 0.15% from other races, and 4.99% from two or more races. Hispanic or Latino of any race were 0.98% of the population.

There were 529 households, out of which 32.1% had children under the age of 18 living with them, 51.0% were married couples living together, 10.6% had a female householder with no husband present, and 32.1% were non-families. 30.2% of all households were made up of individuals, and 14.6% had someone living alone who was 65 years of age or older. The average household size was 2.47 and the average family size was 3.04.

In the city, the population was spread out, with 26.7% under the age of 18, 10.3% from 18 to 24, 25.6% from 25 to 44, 20.0% from 45 to 64, and 17.5% who were 65 years of age or older. The median age was 36 years. For every 100 females, there were 91.2 males. For every 100 females age 18 and over, there were 88.1 males.

The median income for a household in the city was $23,403, and the median income for a family was $30,714. Males had a median income of $26,630 versus $15,813 for females. The per capita income for the city was $11,346. About 15.7% of families and 19.5% of the population were below the poverty line, including 22.3% of those under age 18 and 13.5% of those age 65 or over.

Government
Yale had a city manager form of government.

Notable people
 Chet Baker was born in Yale in 1929.
 Jim Thorpe lived in Yale from 1917 to 1923. His house contains memorabilia related to the famous athlete.

References

External links
 Yale Chamber of Commerce

Cities in Payne County, Oklahoma
Cities in Oklahoma
Populated places established in 1895
1895 establishments in Oklahoma Territory